Shah Sharabeel is a Pakistani theatre and television director. Born and raised in Karachi, Sharabeel is the brother of actress Ushna Shah and son of Ismat Tahira. He directed many notable theatre including Twins Apart, Balaa etc.

References 

Year of birth missing (living people)
Living people
Actors from Lahore
Pakistani television directors
Pakistani theatre directors